Palisades Park is a  park in Santa Monica, California. The park is located along a  section of Ocean Avenue on top of an uplifted unconsolidated sedimentary coastal Quaternary terrace with exposed bluffs, offering views of both the Pacific Ocean and the coastal mountains.

History
The earliest portion of the park was gifted to the City of Santa Monica in 1892 by city founders Arcadia Bandini de Baker and John Percival Jones. The park was originally named Linda Vista Park until 1915.  

Throughout the early 1900s, the city expanded the park with additional land and commissioned upgrades to the area, installing walking paths, planting landscaping, and erecting lighting. In 2007, the park was designated as a historic landmark by the city of Santa Monica. 

Today, the park extends from the Santa Monica Pier at the south to Adelaide Drive at the north.  This long linear park contains public art, rose garden, and historic structures, as well as benches, picnic areas, pétanque courts, restrooms and the historic Santa Monica Camera Obscura. Barriers discourage visitors from approaching too close to the cliffs, which are prone to erosion and landslides.  Private use of the park by fitness instructors has generated some controversy.

There was a train/streetcar stop at the park called Linda Vista station; the building was torn down in 1955.

Public art and historic features 
The oldest structure built in Palisades Park is the Idaho Gate, a Craftsman-style archway built in 1912 and named for the adjacent street, and a distinctive Native American totem pole was donated to the City in 1926 by Walter J. Todd.  After the installation of Eugene H. Monrahan's 1934 sculptural statue of Santa Monica, additional public art was installed more than fifty years later.

 Civil War cannon (1908) (terminus of Colorado Avenue and Broadway) The cannon is an 1861 Rodman seacoast gun on loan from the Federal Government. The cannon was brought to Santa Monica in 1908 from San Francisco
Idaho Gate (1912) by Greene and Greene (terminus of Idaho Avenue)
 Statue of Santa Monica (1934) by Eugene H. Monrahan (terminus of Wilshire Boulevard)
 Bust of Arcadia Bandini de Baker (1987) by Masahito Sanae, near rose garden (terminus of Palisades Avenue)
 Wood sculpture Gestation III (1993) by Baile Oakes (winter solstice sunset alignment) (terminus of Palisades Avenue)
 Sculpture  Beacon Overlook (2000)] by Jody Pinto, near California Incline (terminus of California Avenue)
Totem pole (circa 1925; artist unknown) (terminus of San Vicente Boulevard, Santa Monica)
The Redwood Pergola: known as: The Pergola, Architect: Unknown, Built: 1912, located between Washington Boulevard and Idaho Avenue

Trees
The park has more than 30 species of plants and trees, including gum, yate, pine, palm, and fig trees.  Two stone monuments with plaques honor two noted tree experts, George Hastings and Grace Heintz, who both wrote books on the trees of Santa Monica.  Spanning five decades from 1944 to 1989, the works provide five baseline studies for understanding the history and geography of the urban woodland of the park, as well as the trees in Santa Monica and neighboring portions of Los Angeles, including cemeteries, schools, colleges, and businesses. 

Some of the tree species at Palisades Park include:
 Monterey cypress, Hesperocyparis macrocarpa (Hart.) Bartel
 Indian laurel fig, Ficus microcarpa L.
 rusty-leaf fig, Ficus rubiginosa Desf.
 Yate, Eucalyptus cornuta Labill.
 Murray River red gum, Eucalyptus camaldulensis Dehnh.
 Italian stone pine, Pinus pinea L.
 Canary Island date palm, Phoenix canariensis Chaub.
 European fan palm, Chamaerops humilis L.
 Mexican fan palm, Washingtonia robusta Wendl.
 Mexican blue palm, Brahea armata S. Watson
 windmill palm, Trachycarpus fortunei Wendl.
 Cuban royal palm, Roystonea regia (Kunth) O. F. Cook
 Senegal date palm, Phoenix reclinata Jacq.

References

External links 
 Official website
 

Landmarks in Santa Monica, California
Parks in Los Angeles County, California
Santa Monica, California
Tourist attractions in Santa Monica, California